The House on the Marsh is a 1920 British silent crime film directed by Fred Paul and starring Cecil Humphreys, Peggy Patterson and Harry Welchman. It follows a Governess who unmasks the owner of her house as a criminal. It was based on an 1884 melodramatic novel by Florence Warden.

Cast
 Cecil Humphreys - Gervas Rayner 
 Peggy Patterson - Violet Christie 
 Harry Welchman - Laurence Reed 
 Frank Stanmore - Reverend Golightly 
 Madge Tree - Sarah Gooch 
 Mary Godfrey - Miss Rayner

References

External links

 
 

1920 films
British silent feature films
1920 crime films
Films directed by Fred Paul
Films based on British novels
British black-and-white films
British crime films
1920s English-language films
1920s British films